Vinton Ruth Beckett (12 June 1923 – 1 November 2018) was a Jamaican track and field athlete who competed at the 1948 Summer Olympics, where she was joint fourth in the women's high jump (with Doreen Dredge of Canada), 11th in the women's long jump, and eliminated in the opening round of the women's 80 metres hurdles.

Prior to the Olympics she participated in the 1946 Central American and Caribbean Games, where she won a silver medal in the high jump, behind her compatriot Carmen Phipps. Four years later, at the 1950 edition, she won the high jump event and finished second in the 80 metres hurdles behind another compatriot, Karleen Searchwell. Beckett was born in Kingston, Jamaica.

References

1923 births
2018 deaths
Olympic athletes of Jamaica
Athletes (track and field) at the 1948 Summer Olympics
Jamaican female hurdlers
Jamaican female high jumpers
Sportspeople from Kingston, Jamaica
Central American and Caribbean Games gold medalists for Jamaica
Central American and Caribbean Games silver medalists for Jamaica
Competitors at the 1946 Central American and Caribbean Games
Competitors at the 1950 Central American and Caribbean Games
Central American and Caribbean Games medalists in athletics